The Taiping Huanyu Ji, or "Universal Geography of the Taiping Era [976-983]," is a 10th-century AD geographical treatise by Chinese scholar Yue Shi 樂史 (930-1007), written during the reign of Emperor Taizong of Song in the Northern Song Dynasty. Comprising 200 scrolls (or volumes), it has entries for nearly all areas of China at the time of its publication, complete with place-names and their etymologies.  The work generally follows Tang Dynasty systems of geographical and political designation, dividing China into 13 "Circuits", and then subdividing further into the more traditional "prefectures" and "counties". Because it is largely based on Tang works, it constitutes an important source for the study of Tang geography. 

The Taiping Huanyu Ji generally records places' populations, notable landmarks and religious or ceremonial structures, customs, and basic historical information, sometimes adding details not found in Sima Qian's Records of the Grand Historian, China's most renowned geographical treatise. It also set the trend for including biographies, literary citations, and other material in Chinese geographical works.

Notes

Chinese history texts
Song dynasty literature
10th-century Chinese books